Wang Qiang (16 January 1975 - 17 November 2005) was a Chinese serial killer from Budayuan Town, Kuandian Manchu Autonomous County, Liaoning, China and one of the most notorious murderers and rapists in Chinese history.

Wang grew up in the small village of Kaiyuan, Liaoning city. His father was abusive, addicted to drinking and gambling, and denied Wang the chance to enter school.

Wang committed his first murder on 22 January 1995. He was arrested on 14 July 2003. Official records show he was convicted of 45 murders and 10 rapes. Some young girls were raped post-mortem.

Wang was sentenced to death for the murders and executed in November 2005.

See also
List of serial killers by country
List of serial killers by number of victims
Yang Xinhai
Li Hao (murderer)
Zhu Haiyang
Liu Mingwu
Xu Guangcai

References

1975 births
2005 deaths
21st-century executions by China
Executed Chinese serial killers
Executed people from Liaoning
Executed People's Republic of China people
Male serial killers
Necrophiles
People convicted of murder by the People's Republic of China
People from Tieling
People executed by China by firearm